Loudoun Hill (also commonly Loudounhill) is a volcanic plug in East Ayrshire, Scotland. It is located near the head of the River Irvine, east of Darvel.

Location
The A71 Edinburgh - Kilmarnock road passes by the base of the hill. This route follows a Roman road which linked the Clyde Valley with the Ayrshire coast. Loudoun Hill's position at the highest point on this route gives it huge strategic significance. The hill stands above moorland, and commands 360 degree views. On clear days the coast, 40 km away, and the Isle of Arran beyond, are visible.

Loudoun Hill has long been a site of human occupation. An Iron Age settlement is located at the foot of the south east slope. Nearby at Allanton Beg a Roman fort was built. Finds from the fort include a bronze oil lamp of which a video has been produced.

The Darvel and Strathaven Railway passed the hill, crossing a viaduct which was demolished as unsafe in 1986. Two piers of a bridge remain over a minor road.

William Wallace

Maps of the area name a mound to the east of Loudoun Hill as 'Wallace's Grave'. Traditionally this is the burial site of the English dead, rather than Wallace's own grave. On the slope opposite the mound is a monument to Wallace. Called the 'Spirit of Scotland', it shows an outline of Wallace in steel, five metres high. It was designed by local artist Richard Price 
who helped create the design with friends Robert and Sam Orr until it was placed in its spot in September 2004.

The Battle of Loudoun Hill

The historical Battle of Loudoun Hill took place in 1307. Robert the Bruce, following his time in hiding after the Battle of Methven, had begun his campaign to wrest his kingdom back from Edward I of England. He claimed his first major victory over the English at the Battle of Glen Trool in April 1307.

Robert Bruce adopted almost the same site, although slightly further east, and similar tactics, for another encounter with English forces, this time under Aymer de Valence, 2nd Earl of Pembroke. On 10 May, Bruce's men dug a series of trenches, forcing the English towards boggy ground around Loch Gait. This allowed the 500–600 Scots to repulse an army of 3000. The first attack broke, and the English fled the field. Following the battle, Bruce left his brother Edward Bruce in command of the area, and headed north to continue his guerilla campaign in Buchan.

Covenanters
On 1 June 1679 a large conventicle, or outdoor religious service, was held at Loudoun Hill. The service was organised by the outlawed Covenanters, but was well attended.  John Graham of Claverhouse, recently appointed to suppress the religious rebels, heard about the conventicle and headed to the area. His attempt to break up the gathering led to a skirmish known as the Battle of Drumclog, in which Claverhouse's dragoons were humiliatingly routed. The battle site lies around 1 km east of the hill. This battle formed the initial action of Walter Scott's novel Old Mortality.

Rock climbing
The hill is a popular rock climbing venue, being home to some of a small number of rocky outcrops in central Scotland. There is rock climbing information on Loudoun Hill available at Scottish Climbs  and 
UK Climbing.

Farming

Loudoun Hill and the lands immediately around were farmed intensively for many generations, as shown by OS maps. Two farms were however abandoned between the 19th and 20th centuries, namely Underhill and Backhill. The ruins still stand and provide shelter for the sheep from surviving farms that continue to graze Loudoun Hill and the surrounding fields.

References

Notes

Sources
 Service, John (1890). Thir Notandums being the literary recreations of the Laird Canticarl of Mongrynen. Edinburgh & London : Y. J. Pentland.

Mountains and hills of the Southern Uplands
Mountains and hills of East Ayrshire
Volcanic plugs of Scotland
Climbing areas of Scotland
Tourist attractions in East Ayrshire
Volcanism of Scotland